John William Castine (27 May 1846 – 13 June 1939) was an Australian politician who represented the South Australian House of Assembly multi-member seat of Wooroora from 1884 to 1902, representing the National Defence League from 1893.

See also
Hundred of Castine

References

1846 births
1939 deaths
Members of the South Australian House of Assembly